Whorton may refer to:

Isaac Whorton (born 1980), American politician
J. M. Whorton, the owner of an automobile sales business
Ritchie Whorton (born 1960), American politician
Ant Whorton-Eales (born 1994), British racing driver

See also
Whorton v. Bockting, 549 U.S. 406 (2007), a United States Supreme Court case
John Hart Whorton House, located in Appleton, Wisconsin, United States
Warton (disambiguation)
Wharton (disambiguation)
Worton (disambiguation)